The Elizaville Cemetery is located in Elizaville, Kentucky.

Notable burials
 Woodie Fryman (1940–2011), Major League Baseball left-handed pitcher (1966–83)
 Franklin Sousley (1925–1945), one of six U.S. Marines to raise the American flag on Mount Suribachi during the Battle of Iwo Jima in 1945.

References

External links
 
  

Cemeteries in Kentucky
Buildings and structures in Fleming County, Kentucky